Robert Wasson Brady  (October 6, 1825 – March 26, 1891) was an American Catholic priest who led several Jesuit institutions in the United States. He served twice as the president of the College of the Holy Cross from 1867 to 1869 and from 1883 to 1887. He was also the second president of Boston College from 1869 to 1870 and the provincial superior of the Jesuits' Maryland Province from 1877 to 1882.

Early life 
Robert Wasson Brady was born on October 6, 1825, in Hancock, Maryland. In his youth, Brady's father died and his mother moved the family to Frederick, Maryland, so that Brady could study at Saint John's College. He then decided to enter religious life, and proceeded to the Jesuit novitiate in Frederick, where he entered the Society of Jesus on August 31, 1843.

In 1845, Brady became a professor of rudiments at Georgetown College. However, he began experiencing health problems and his superiors transferred him in 1847 to the newly founded College of the Holy Cross in Worcester, Massachusetts, where they thought the climate would be more advantageous to his health. Brady's health did improve, and he was made the prefect of the school as well as a professor of grammar and poetry.

Formative years in Maryland 
While continuing in his roles as prefect and professor, Brady began his next stage of Jesuit formation, the study of philosophy and theology, in September 1853. Four years later, he completed his studies and was ordained a priest by Archbishop Peter Richard Kenrick of St. Louis on July 25, 1857, in the students' chapel at Holy Cross. Brady was then promoted to vice president and first prefect of discipline of the school.

In 1859, Brady returned to Frederick in 1859 to complete his third year of probation (a part of his Jesuit formation). He professed his third vow on August 15, 1860. That year, he was sent to Loyola College in Baltimore, where he became a minister and teacher of algebra. In 1861, he was assigned to teach juniors at the college, and the following year, he left the college to become a priest at St. Aloysius Church in Washington, D.C. His time in Washington coincided with the Civil War, and Brady ministered to soldiers in military hospitals.

Academic career in New England 
At the end of 1863, Brady moved to Boston, where he became the superior of St. Mary's Church in the North End. On July 10 of that year, he was elected to a three-year term as the treasurer and a member of the board of directors of Boston College. As superior of St. Mary's, Brady refused to continue paying the $3,000 per year (equivalent to approximately $ in ) to Boston College that had been paid by his predecessors. The college's president, John Bapst, unsuccessfully protested Brady's decision, and Bishop John Bernard Fitzpatrick of Boston stated that St. Mary's had been placed under the direction of the Society of Jesus so that its revenue could support the newly founded Boston College.

On February 27, 1867, Brady was named the president of the College of the Holy Cross, replacing James Clark. The college's board of trustees authorized Brady to take out $46,000 in loans to expand the school physical facilities. Brady oversaw the addition of a west wing and spires to Fenwick Hall, the college's original building. The new wing included a library, meeting rooms for the debating society, and dormitories for students and the Jesuits; it also saw the addition of steam heating to the building. The project cost a total of $50,000.  Brady left to become the second president of Boston College on August 27, 1869, succeeding John Bapst. At Holy Cross, he was succeeded by Anthony F. Ciampi. Instead of taking the typical title of president and rector, Brady and his successor, Robert J. Fulton, took the title of vice rector, because the school was still in the process of being established. On August 2, 1870, Brady left Boston College to once again resume the position of superior of St. Mary's Church. At St. Mary's, he oversaw the construction of a new church building and rectory.

Provincial leadership 
Brady succeeded Joseph E. Keller as the provincial superior of the Jesuits' Maryland Province on May 8, 1877, and professed his final vows that day. With the unification of the Maryland and New York provinces on August 7, 1879, Brady assumed the position of provincial of the New York Province. The province was renamed the Maryland–New York Province on August 19, 1880. Brady was succeeded as provincial by Robert J. Fulton on May 28, 1882.

On June 28, 1883, he again returned to the College of the Holy Cross to replace Edward D. Boone as president. In 1883, while president, Brady was sent to the Jesuits' 23rd general congregation as an elector. Despite experiencing poor health, he was sent to Italy in 1886 to temporarily become the procurator of the Jesuit Province of Fiesole. Upon his return in November 1886, he became the vice provincial superior and acting superior of the Maryland–New York Province while Fulton was appointed a visitor in Ireland; Brady held this position until May 1887. Brady's second term as president of Holy Cross ended on August 2, 1887, and he was succeeded by Samuel Cahill.

Later years 
Around this time, Brady became ill and was assigned to various posts in Maryland and Washington, D.C. that would be less taxing than his previous roles. He then was made the superior of St. Thomas Manor in Charles County and then spiritual father at Georgetown College.

In 1890, Brady succeeded Stephen A. Kelly as the pastor of Holy Trinity Church in Georgetown, where he would spend the remainder of his life. On March 16, 1891, he became ill with pneumonia and was taken to nearby Georgetown College. He was administered last rites on March 26, and he died that day. John J. Murphy replaced Brady as pastor of Holy Trinity. His funeral was held at Holy Trinity Church on March 30, and he was buried that day in the Jesuit Community Cemetery.

References

Sources 

 
 
 
 

1825 births
1891 deaths
People from Hancock, Maryland
Saint John's Catholic Prep (Maryland) alumni
19th-century American Jesuits
Presidents of the College of the Holy Cross
Presidents of Boston College
Provincial superiors of the Jesuit Maryland Province
Pastors of Holy Trinity Catholic Church (Washington, D.C.)
Burials at the Jesuit Community Cemetery